The Saratoga Avenue station was a station on the demolished BMT Fulton Street Line in Brooklyn, New York City. It had 2 tracks and 2 side platforms. It was built on December 3, 1888 and was served by trains of the BMT Fulton Street Line. Saratoga Avenue replaced Ralph Avenue as the penultimate station on the line until it was expanded to Atlantic Avenue on July 4th, 1889. The next stop to the east was Rockaway Avenue. The next stop to the west was Ralph Avenue.

In 1936, the Independent Subway System built their own Fulton Street subway, but unlike the next stops to the west and east, it did not add a subway station to compete with Saratoga Avenue. The el station became obsolete, and it closed on May 31, 1940.

References

Defunct BMT Fulton Street Line stations
Railway stations in the United States opened in 1888
Railway stations closed in 1940
Former elevated and subway stations in Brooklyn